Stadtpfarrkirche St. Johann (Saint John's parish church) is a Roman Catholic parish church in the city of Rapperswil, canton of St. Gallen, Switzerland.

Geography 
The church is located next to Rapperswil Castle on the so-called Herrenberg hill to the northeast of Stadtmuseum Rapperswil. The Catholic city cemetery is situated to the north of the church, some meters to the northwest there is the so-called Liebfrauenkapelle (St. Mary's chapel) situated, built in 1489 on the former ossuary. As of today it's the cemetery's chapel and also popular for weddings thanks to its location overlooking Kempratnerbucht at Kempraten lake shore.

History 
Rapperswil Castle, the town walls of the former locus Endingen and the parish church were built by Count Rudolf II and his son Rudolf III of Rapperswil around 1220/29. The former parish church was located at Busskirch on upper Zürichsee lake shore, being one of the oldest churches around the lake area. Even the citizens of Rapperswil had to attend services in Busskirch until Count Rudolf II built his own parish church on the Herrenberg hill next to the castle. Legally, Rapperswil church was subordinated to 1253 the parish of St. Johann Busskirch and thus the Pfäfers abbey. In 1489 the adjacent Liebfrauenkapelle (St. Mary's chapel) was built, the cemetery chapel that still exists.

On 24 November 1446 Ellsbetha, gräffin zu Togckenburg granted a benefice (Pfründe) in the amount of 800 Rheinische Gulden to the Allerheiligen altar of the church, sealed by Countess Elisabeth and certified by Schultheiss und Rat der Stadt Rapperswil.

Since 1737 «Bruderschaft der hl. Caecilia und Katharina» (Brotherhood of St. Cecilia and Catherine) provides an enormous repertoire of church music for the parish among them around 1,000 compositions of the Rapperswil-born church musicians and composers Carl Greith (1828–1887) and his father Franz Josef Greith (1799–1869) who composed the Rütli anthem («Von ferne sei herzlich gegrüsst, du stilles Gelände am See»). On 30 January 1881 the church was partially destroyed by fire, and rebuilt from 1881 to 1885.

The very first roses in Rapperswil blossom at the southern wall and at the present Stadtmuseum Rapperswil next to the Schloss Rapperswil because their medieval sandstone walls are exposed to the sun all through the year.

Architecture 
The Romanesque hall church and the northern church tower were built around 1220/29 by Count Rudolf II of Rappperswil and extended in 1383 to the west. In 1441 a smaller but massively southern church tower was built. Collection campaigns in 1493/97 allowed to rebuild the hall church into a tripartite Gothic choir with arched ceiling and tracery windows. Following the Reformation in Switzerland, two Renaissance wing altars in the side chapels were added respectively latter moved to other chapels. Thus, these altars were not destroyed by fire on January 30, 1882, as well as the sacristy located in the southern church tower, along with the precious treasure of the church: masterpieces by the goldsmiths Breny from Rapperswil, Dietrich, Dumeisen and Rüssi Ysenschlegel, being one of the richest in the Linth territory.

Advised by the art historian Johann Rudolf Rahn, the architect Xaver Müller rebuilt the largely destroyed building. A choir with neo-Gothic vaulting star was added, the nave extended by a few meters and a double wooden ceiling. The neo-Gothic altars and the pulpit are created by Atelier Marggraf in Munich. The rededication took place on October 6, 1885. The large chandelier was built in 1894 by the company Benziger & Co. in Einsiedeln. Renovations were done in 1959/60 (exterior and new bells), in 1971/73 and 1981.

The church bells in the large southern tower have a prominent sound by seven bells; one of 1537 and six were added in 1960. On Saturdays at 3 pm for about eight minutes all the bells rung for Sunday.

Pipe organ 

The pipe organ in the gallery was installed by Mathys Orgelbau AG in 1975.

Parish 
The parish St. Johann was founded by Count Rudolf III von Rapperswil in 1253, and is now the Catholic parish Rapperswil-Jona comprising about 3900 devotees and the area of the city of Rapperswil (Jona has its own Catholic parish). John the Baptist is the patron saint of the parish since 1253.

Protection 
The St. Johann church and Liebfrauenkapelle are listed in the Swiss inventory of cultural property of national and regional significance as Class B objects of regional importance.

References

Literature 
 Peter Röllin: Kulturbaukasten Rapperswil-Jona. Rapperswil-Jona 2005.

External links 

  

Churches in the canton of St. Gallen
Buildings and structures in Rapperswil-Jona
House of Rapperswil
13th-century Roman Catholic church buildings in Switzerland
Roman Catholic churches completed in 1229
Cultural property of regional significance in the canton of St. Gallen
Tourist attractions in Rapperswil-Jona
Gothic architecture in Switzerland
Romanesque architecture in Switzerland